Carlo Carafa (1584–1644) was a Roman Catholic prelate who served as Bishop of Aversa (1616–1644) and Apostolic Nuncio to Emperor (1621–1628).

Biography
Carlo Carafa was born in Naples, Italy in 1584.
On 19 July 1616, he was appointed during the papacy of Pope Paul V as Bishop of Aversa.
On 21 September 1616, he was consecrated bishop by Giambattista Leni, Bishop of Ferrara, with Galeazzo Sanvitale, Archbishop Emeritus of Bari-Canosa, and Antonio Díaz (bishop), Bishop of Caserta, serving as co-consecrators.
On 17 April 1621, he was appointed  Apostolic Nuncio to Ferdinand II, Holy Roman Emperor, by Pope Gregory XV, where he served until his resignation on 9 Sep 1628.
He served as Bishop of Aversa until his death in April 1644.

Episcopal succession
While bishop, he was the principal co-consecrator of:
Miguel Juan Balaguer Camarasa, Bishop of Malta (1635);
Domenico Ravenna, Bishop of Nicastro (1635); 
Luigi Pappacoda, Bishop of Capaccio (1635); and 
Marco Morosini, Bishop of Treviso (1639).

References

External links and additional sources
 (for Chronology of Bishops) 
 (for Chronology of Bishops) 
 (for Chronology of Bishops)  

17th-century Italian Roman Catholic bishops
Bishops appointed by Pope Paul V
Bishops appointed by Pope Gregory XV
Bishops of Aversa
1584 births
1644 deaths
Apostolic Nuncios to the Holy Roman Empire